John E. Bortle is an American amateur astronomer. He is best known for creating the Bortle scale to quantify the darkness of the night sky.

Bortle has made a special study of comets. He has recorded thousands of observations relating to more than 300 comets. From 1977 until 1994 he authored the monthly '"Comet Digest" in Sky and Telescope magazine. He also had a special interest in variable stars, recording more than 200,000 observations. From 1970 until 2000 he edited the monthly AAVSO circular for the American Association of Variable Star Observers. 

He published his darkness scale in Sky and Telescope magazine in 2001.  The scale ranges from 1 (extremely dark rural area or national park, usually at high elevation, low humidity, and low wind) to 9 (urban inner city).

Bortle has contributed more than 215,000 visual observations to the AAVSO's database.

Recognition
 Astronomical Society of the Pacific's Comet Medal (1974) for significant contributions to the research of comets.
 American Association of Variable Star Observers 23rd Merit Award (1983), for his editorship of the AAVSO Circular and observing record.
 E.E.Barnard Observers Award of the Western Amateur Astronomers (1990), for his observational work on comets.
 The asteroid 4673 Bortle was named in his honor.
 Walter Scott Houston Award of the Northeast Region of the Astronomical League (2010).
 Leslie Peltier Award from the Astronomical League (2013).

References

Year of birth missing (living people)
Living people
Amateur astronomers